James Wallis may refer to:

Politicians
James Wallis (New Zealand politician) (1825–1912), New Zealand politician
James Wallis (English politician), MP

Others
James Wallis (British Army officer) (1785–1858), major of the 46th Regiment, commandant of Newcastle convict settlement
James Wallis (games designer), British writer, games designer and publisher
Jim Wallis (born 1948), Christian writer and activist
Jimmy Wallis (born 1974), English field hockey player
James H. Wallis (1861–1940), Latter Day Saint hymnwriter, editor and Patriarch
James Wallis (1809–1895), pioneer Wesleyan Missionary New Zealand

See also
James Wallace (disambiguation)